Sibiryakov is a Russian or Ukrainian surname.

Notable people with the surname include:
 Alexander Sibiryakov (1849-1933), Russian gold mine and factories owner and explorer of Siberia
 Andrei Sibiryakov (1964-1989/1990), Russian serial killer
 Eduard Sibiryakov (1941–2004), Russian volleyball player
 Serhiy Sibiryakov (born 1982), Ukrainian-born Russian footballer

Russian-language surnames
Ukrainian-language surnames
Ethnonymic surnames